Albert Aiken may refer to:

 Vic Aicken (Albert Victor Aicken, 1914–1972), Northern Irish footballer
 Albert W. Aiken (1846–1894), American actor and author